Man Alive: A True Story of Violence, Forgiveness and Becoming a Man is a nonfiction book by Thomas Page McBee, published September 8, 2014, by City Lights Publishers. The book centres on the question "What does it really mean to be a man?" as McBee shares his negative experiences with masculinity, including childhood abuse and a mugging, both perpetrated by men.

In 2014, the book won a Lambda Literary Award for Transgender Nonfiction.

Reception 
Man Alive received starred reviews from Publishers Weekly, Kirkus Reviews, Lambda Literary Foundation, and Library Journal.

Publishers Weekly noted, "McBee’s lyrical, achingly honest exploration of loss and maturation offers a hopeful antidote to more toxic forms of masculinity."

Kirkus called the book "quite a story, masterfully rendered."

Publishers Weekly, NPR, and Kirkus named Man Alive one of the best nonfiction books of 2014. Advocate included it in their list of the 10 best transgender nonfiction books of the year.

References 

Lambda Literary Award-winning works
2014 non-fiction books
2010s LGBT literature
Transgender non-fiction books
LGBT literature in the United States
City Lights Publishers books